Skillings is an English surname.  Notable people with the surname include:

David Skillings, American lumber magnate and builder of the Skillings Estate House
Muzz Skillings, American musician, bassist for the band Living Colour
Waldo McTavish Skillings (1906–1981), insurance agent and political figure in British Columbia

See also
Skilling (disambiguation)

English-language surnames